NGC 1512 is a barred spiral galaxy approximately 38 million light-years away from Earth in the constellation Horologium. The galaxy displays a double ring structure, with a (nuclear) ring around the galactic nucleus and an (inner) further out in the main disk. The galaxy hosts an extended UV disc with at least 200 clusters with recent star formation activity. NGC 1512 is a member of the Dorado Group.

Gravitational interaction with NGC 1510
Gravitational tidal forces of NGC 1512 are influencing nearby dwarf lenticular galaxy NGC 1510. The two galaxies are separated by only ∼5 arcmin (13.8 kpc), and are in the process of a lengthy merger which has been going on for 400 million years. At the end of this process NGC 1512 will have cannibalised its smaller companion.

Interaction between these two galaxies has triggered star formation activity in the outskirts of the disc and enhanced the tidal distortion in the arms of the NGC 1512. The interaction seems to occur in the north-western areas of the system because of the broadening of the H i arm and the spread of the UV-rich star clusters in this region.

Gallery

See also
 NGC 4314
 Messier 94

References

External links

 
 SPACE.com: Baby Stars Clean House Quickly

Barred spiral galaxies
Interacting galaxies
Dorado Group
Horologium (constellation)
1512
014391
Ring galaxies